The 2010–11 season was Granada CF's 80th season in existence and the club's first season back in the second division of Spanish football since 1988.

Players

First-team squad 
As of 31 January 2011.

Out on loan

Pre-season and friendlies

Competitions

Overall record

Segunda División

League table

Results summary

Results by round

Matches

Source:

Copa del Rey

References 

Granada CF seasons
Spanish football clubs 2010–11 season